Nastar can refer to one of the following:
NASTAR (NAtional STAndard Race), the world's largest known recreational ski and snowboard race program.
Contraction of nanas tart, the Indonesian term for a pineapple tart.